State Route 611 (SR 611) is an east–west state highway in the northern portion of the U.S. state of Ohio.  The western terminus of SR 611 is at a partial interchange with US 6 in Lorain.  Its eastern terminus is at a signalized intersection with SR 254 in Avon.

Route description
The entirety of SR 611 exists within northern Lorain County.  No part of the highway is included as a component of the National Highway System.

History
SR 611 was designated in 1937.  Originally, the highway began at US 6 where it meets Colorado Avenue east of where US 6 crosses the Black River near downtown Lorain and followed Colorado Avenue southeast to where the current SR 611 comes in at the intersection with Kansas Avenue and Henderson Drive.  From there, the highway was routed along its current alignment to its eastern terminus at SR 254 in Avon.

In 1946, SR 611 took on the alignment that it follows today, as the result of a westward extension.  From the intersection of Colorado Avenue, Kansas Avenue and Henderson Drive in Lorain, the highway was re-routed south onto Henderson Drive, which is used to cross the Black River, then turned southwesterly into a connection with 21st Street, which it followed heading west across Lorain to its current western terminus at US 6 in the northwestern portion of the city.

Major intersections

References

611
Transportation in Lorain County, Ohio
Lorain, Ohio